The Japan Academy Prize for Best Film Editing is one of the Japan Academy Prize presented annually by the Japan Academy Prize Association. It is one of several awards presented for feature films.

Award Winners

External links
 Japan Academy Prize official website 
 The winner and nominees 

Editing
Film editing awards
Awards established in 1984
1984 establishments in Japan